Sem Dekkers (born 28 May 2004) is a Dutch footballer who plays for Jong AZ.

Personal life
Sem Dekkers is the younger brother of fellow footballer and former Jong AZ defender Quinten Dekkers. Dekkers is of Indonesian descent through his mother.

Career
Dekkers was with his hometown club HSV Heiloo before switching to the AZ academy in 2014 along with his brother Quinten. He signed a contract with AZ in June 2021 taking him through to the summer of 2023, with the option of an extra season. Sem Dekkers made his debut for Jong AZ appearing as a substitute on 8 August, 2022 in a 2-0 home win against MVV Maastricht.

International career
In 2022, Dekkers played for the Dutch U19 team.

References

External links
 
 Ons Oranje U15 profile
 Ons Oranje U18 profile

Living people
2004 births
Dutch footballers
People from Heiloo
Netherlands youth international footballers
Dutch people of Indonesian descent
Eerste Divisie players
Jong AZ players
21st-century Dutch people